Ma. Kristina Marasigan, better known as Tina Marasigan (born May 2, 1989) is a Filipina model, beauty queen, and journalist best known as a news anchor for ABS-CBN News, and for having been a finalist in the 2009 Ford Supermodel of the World competition and the 2011 Binibining Pilipinas pageant.

TV Shows
 Bandila (ABS-CBN Channel 2, 2012-2020)
 Fastbreak (S+A "Formerly Studio 23" 2014-2016)
 Todo Todo Walang Preno (TeleRadyo "Formerly DZMM TeleRadyo" 2013-2020) - substitute guest host for Winnie Cordero
 TV Patrol (ABS-CBN Channel 2, 2012-2020)
 UAAP Sports Coverage (S+A "Formerly Studio 23", 2011-2014)
 Umagang Kay Ganda (ABS-CBN Channel 2, 2017-2020)
 Usapang Kalye (TeleRadyo "Formerly DZMM TeleRadyo" 2020-2021)

See also

Athena Imperial
Cathy Untalan
Diane Querrer
Emma Tiglao
Ganiel Krishnan

References 

Living people
1989 births
Philippine Military Academy alumni
Filipino female models
University of Santo Tomas alumni
Filipino journalists
Filipino women journalists
ABS-CBN News and Current Affairs people
Binibining Pilipinas contestants
Star Magic